Deciduous holly is a common name for several plants and may refer to:
 Ilex decidua
 Ilex verticillata